The name Heidi has been used for two tropical cyclones in the Atlantic Ocean. 

 Hurricane Heidi (1967)
 Tropical Storm Heidi (1971)

The name Heidi has also been used in the Australian Region. 
 Cyclone Heidi (2012) – a small and moderately-powerful tropical cyclone that struck Western Australia in January 2012.

Atlantic hurricane set index articles
Australian region cyclone set index articles